The Patten Free Library is a public library in Bath, Maine, United States. It also serves the communities of Arrowsic, Georgetown, West Bath, and Woolwich.

The Patten Library Association was founded in 1847. In 1887,  Galen C. Moses donated $10,000 to fund a building for the library. The original building was designed by George Edward Harding, and was finished in 1890. New wings were built in 1961 and 1998.

References

Library buildings completed in 1889
Libraries in Sagadahoc County, Maine
Buildings and structures in Bath, Maine
1847 establishments in Maine